New York State Route 58 (NY 58) is a north–south state highway located in St. Lawrence County, New York, in the United States. The highway runs in a northwest to southeast direction as it traverses the county. The southern terminus of the route is at a junction with NY 3 in the hamlet of Fine within the town of the same name. Its northern terminus is at an intersection with NY 37 near the St. Lawrence River in the hamlet of Morristown. Part of NY 58 passes through the Adirondack Mountains.

Route description

Fine to Gouverneur town 
NY 58 begins at an intersection with NY 3 in the town of Fine within the Adirondack Park. NY 58 proceeds immediately northward from NY 3, crossing a creek and into the hamlet of Fine. In Fine, NY 58 bends westward, intersecting with County Route 27A (CR 27A). NY 58 becomes a two-lane residential street before bending northwest out of the hamlet. For a distance after the hamlet, NY 58 remains residential, soon succumbing to dense woods before leaving the Adirondack Park near an intersection with Colony Road. After leaving the Adirondack Park, NY 58 bends northward into the town of Edwards, becoming a two-lane residential street before intersecting with the northern terminus of CR 23 (East Pitcairn–South Edwards Road).

Through Edwards, NY 58 bends to the northeast, intersecting with former alignments of itself, becoming a two-lane dense woods road. NY 58 bends northward into fields and after an intersection with Harmon Road, bends northwest. NY 58 begins passing spacious residences as it turns westward, crossing south of the hamlet of Edwards. After crossing a creek, the route bends to the southwest, intersecting with CR 24 (Gouverneur Road). Continuing a bend to the southeast through Edwards, NY 58 turns westward and becomes a two-lane residential street for a short distance. NY 58 passes south of Talcville before turning to the southwest alongside power lines, intersecting with a branch of CR 24. NY 58 continues a southwestern wind over a creek, crossing into the town of Fowler. 

NY 58 crosses a railroad alignment through Fowler, bending northwest into the hamlet of Fowler, where it intersects with NY 812. NY 58 and NY 812 become concurrent through Fowler, becoming a two-lane farm street northward, intersecting with CR 22 (Little York Road). The railroad rejoins the two roads north of the hamlet, paralleling NY 58 and NY 812 to the northwest, as the roads become a two-lane residential road. The routes enter the hamlet of Hailesboro, where the railroad crosses near an industrial complex. Crossing a former alignment of NY 58, NY 58 and NY 812 turn northward into the town of Gouverneur. The roads gain the moniker of Williams Street, proceeding northward as a two-lane residential street before crossing the river into downtown Gouverneur.

Gouveneur village to Morristown 

In Gouveneur, NY 812 forks east onto a concurrency with US 11 (East Main Street) while NY 58 continues northward through the village as Clinton Street. The route becomes a two-lane residential street before turning southwest along West Barney Street. NY 58 bends along the riverside, paralleling the north of CR 12 (Johnstown Street), leaving for the town of Gouverneur. NY 58 turns northward into the hamlet of Natural Dam, passing a dam before turning west once again. The route returns the rural backdrop, bending to the northwest into the hamlet of Little Bow. In Little Bow, NY 58 is a two-lane residential street, before crossing into the hamlet of Elmdale.

In Elmdale, NY 58 proceeds northward across a river, winding its way northward through the town of Gouverneur. After the intersection with Pine Hill Road, NY 58 crosses into the town of Macomb. The route becomes a two-lane residential street, bending to the northwest into the hamlet. At the rural hamlet, CR 10 intersects at-grade. Bending northwest near Pleasant Lake, NY 58 enters the hamlet of Brasie Corners. In Brasie Corners, NY 58 becomes a two-lane residential, intersecting with the northern terminus of CR 8 (Brasie Corners–Rossie Road). NY 58 leaves Brasie Corners, bending to the northeast at a junction with Hutton Road in Stark School Corner.

NY 58 continues north through Macomb, becoming a two-lane farm highway into the hamlet of Ruby Corner, where a former alignment parallels to the east once again. NY 58 bends to the northwest for less than a half-mile, becoming a lakeside highway along Black Lake. NY 58 soon turns to the northeast along the lakeside, entering the residential hamlet of Pope Mills. In Pope Mills, NY 58 intersects with the western terminus of New York State Route 184. After NY 184, NY 58 turns northward through Macomb, further away from Black Lake as a residential highway. A short distance later, the route crosses over Black Lake via a two-lane causeway, entering the hamlet of Edwardsville on the opposite shore. Upon entering Edwardsville, NY 58 is now in the town of Morristown, intersecting with CR 6 (Black Lake Road).

Continuing northwest from CR 6, NY 58 proceeds away from Black Lake as a two-lane rural roadway, crossing several local roads. NY 58 soon enters the hamlet and former village of Morristown, where it intersects with NY 37 (the Seaway Trail). The right-of-way continues north into the hamlet as Main Street towards the St. Lawrence River.

History
The entirety of NY 58 was assigned as part of the 1930 renumbering of state highways in New York. At the time, NY 58 directly served the hamlets of Edwards and Fullerville. It was realigned to bypass Fullerville to the north  and Edwards to the southwest in the mid-1960s.

Major intersections

See also

References

External links

058
Transportation in St. Lawrence County, New York